Heydar Alat (also Romanized as Ḩeydar Ālāt) is a village in Gurab Pas Rural District, in the Central District of Fuman County, Gilan Province, Iran. At the 2006 census, its population was 716, in 173 families.

References 

Populated places in Fuman County